Sloman Glacier is a glacier flowing between Mount Liotard and Mount Ditte to the southeast coast of Adelaide Island. Named by the United Kingdom Antarctic Place-Names Committee (UK-APC) in 1963 for William O. Sloman, British Antarctic Survey Personnel Officer for a number of years beginning in 1956.

See also
 List of glaciers in the Antarctic
 Glaciology

 

Glaciers of Adelaide Island